Lauren Arthur is an American politician and former schoolteacher from the state of Missouri. She is a member  Missouri State Senate for District 17 and a former member of the Missouri House of Representatives. A member of the Democratic Party, she won a special election to succeed Ryan Silvey on June 5, 2018.

Biography 
Arthur is from Kansas City. She graduated from the International Baccalaureate program at North Kansas City High School. Arthur earned her Bachelor of Arts degree from Smith College in 2010 and her Master of Education from the University of Missouri–St. Louis. She taught through Teach For America.

Arthur was first elected to the Missouri House in 2014 and took office in 2015. In the 2018 special election for Missouri State Senate District 17, which covers most of Kansas City suburb Clay County, Arthur defeated her Republican opponent, fellow Missouri state representative Kevin Corlew, by a 20-point margin. She replaced Republican Ryan Silvey, who won re-election to the seat in 2016 by 20 points, before he stepped down to join Missouri's public service commission. Republican presidential candidates Mitt Romney and Donald Trump had each won the district by four points.

Electoral history

State Representative

State Senate

References

External links

Living people
Democratic Party members of the Missouri House of Representatives
People from Clay County, Missouri
Educators from Missouri
People from Kansas City, Kansas
Women state legislators in Missouri
Educators from Kansas
21st-century American women educators
21st-century American educators
21st-century American women politicians
21st-century American politicians
Smith College alumni
University of Missouri–St. Louis alumni
Year of birth missing (living people)
Teach For America alumni